Hypertropha desumptana is a moth in the family Depressariidae. It was described by Francis Walker in 1863. It is found in Australia, where it has been recorded from Queensland.

Adults are cupreous black, the forewings hardly acute, yellowish cinereous towards the base,  and with some yellowish-cinereous exterior speckles. There are some transverse irregular interrupted metallic blue and purple lines, as well as an oblique costal subapical yellowish-cinereous streak. The marginal line is dark fawn colour and irregular. The hindwings are luteous, with a broad cupreous-black border.

References

Moths described in 1863
Hypertropha